Natalia Ihorivna Popova (born September 15, 1993) is a Ukrainian former competitive figure skater. She is a five-time Ukrainian national champion (2010, 2012–2015) and won five senior international medals. She represented Ukraine at the 2014 Winter Olympics, competing in the team trophy and individual ladies' singles event.

During her competitive career, Popova trained in Hackensack, New Jersey, while her family lived in Ontario, Canada. She began coaching in 2013, in the United States, and later joined the Richmond Training Centre in Richmond Hill, Ontario.

Programs

Competitive highlights 
GP: Grand Prix; CS: Challenger Series; JGP: Junior Grand Prix

References

External links 

 

1993 births
Living people

Ukrainian emigrants to Canada
Ukrainian female single skaters
Sportspeople from Simferopol
Figure skaters at the 2014 Winter Olympics
Olympic figure skaters of Ukraine